Manfred Wong (Wong Man-Chun; born 5 June 1957, in Hong Kong) is a Hong Kong radio personality, film producer, screenwriter, film director and actor. He is best known for his involvement as a writer for the Young and Dangerous film series.

Biography
Born in 1957 in Hong Kong, Wong had studied at St. Paul's Convent School. Thereafter, he majored in communications at Baptist College, but dropped out before completion and took up the post as a TV copywriter. In 1972, he worked as a writer for magazines and newspapers. In 1977, he became a scriptwriter at RTV and was involved in several drama series such as Reincarnated and Dragon Strike. He entered the film industry in 1979, working in the creative side of production.

In 1995 he formed a partnership with director-cinematographer Andrew Lau and writer-producer-director Wong Jing to establish BoB and Partners Co. Ltd., the creative team most noted for its creation of the very successful Young and Dangerous which established box-office-record-breaking success. The 'BoB' stands for "Best of the Best."

Filmography

Writer
 The Last Tycoon (2012)
 Loving Him (2002)
 Women From Mars (2002)
 For Bad Boys Only (2000)
 Born to Be King (2000)
 Tau mung (2000)
 Those Were the Days... (2000)
 A Man Called Hero (1999)
 Sex and Zen III (1998)
 The Storm Riders (1998)
 Young and Dangerous: The Prequel (1998)
 Portland Street Blues (1998)
 Young and Dangerous 5 (1998)
 Young and Dangerous 4 (1997)
 Young and Dangerous (1996)
 Young and Dangerous 2 (1996)
 Young and Dangerous 3 (1996)
 Street Angels (1996)
 The Trail (1993)
 Deadly Dream Woman (1992)
 The Perfect Match (1991)
 Yu pui tsuen II (1987)
 Rich and Famous (1987)
 Soul (1986)
 Dream Lovers (1986)
 Carry on Doctors and Nurses (1985)
 Twinkle Twinkle Little Star (1983)
 Everlasting Love (1983)
 Lonely Fifteen (1982)
 Duel to the Death (1982)
 Encore'' (1980)

References

External links
 Official Website
 
 HKcinemagic.com entry

Hong Kong screenwriters
Hong Kong film producers
Hong Kong film directors
Hong Kong male actors
Hong Kong people
1957 births
Living people